Cyperus phillipsiae is a species of sedge that is native to eastern parts of Africa.

See also 
 List of Cyperus species

References 

phillipsiae
Plants described in 1936
Flora of Somalia
Flora of Kenya
Taxa named by Georg Kükenthal